Derek Ali (born November 1, 1989), better known by his moniker MixedByAli, is an American mixing engineer. His career began in Los Angeles in the late 2000s recording and mixing for Top Dawg Entertainment artists Kendrick Lamar, Jay Rock, SZA and more recently Bas, Nipsey Hussle, Snoop Dogg and many others.

In 2018, he invented an online mixing program and community for mixing engineers called EngineEars which is aimed at teaching upcoming engineers techniques that will improve the quality of mixes they create and provide a world class mixing access to artists remotely.

Technique 
Ali mixes "in the box" (without the use of analog gear) when working with certain audio effects, such as vocals. However, he credits a mixing console for his "crispiness". About using hardware, Ali says: "If you have the gear, I suggest you use it. How I look at this way of mixing is I feel like you're inside the computer."

About 80% of his time spent mixing is in mono, which is a method he learned from Dr. Dre.

Awards 
Ali has been nominated for the Grammy Awards 6 times and has won twice.

Nominations 

 2012: Album of the Year – good kid, m.A.A.d city by Kendrick Lamar
 2015: Album of the Year – To Pimp a Butterfly by Kendrick Lamar
 2017: Album of the Year – DAMN. by Kendrick Lamar
 2017: Record of the Year – HUMBLE. by Kendrick Lamar

Wins 

 2015: Best Rap Album – To Pimp a Butterfly by Kendrick Lamar
 2018: Record of the Year – This Is America by Childish Gambino

Discography 
 2021: Brockhampton – Roadrunner: New Light, New Machine
 2020: Spillage Village – Spilligion
 2020: Glass Animals – "Space Ghost Coast to Coast"
 2018: Bas – Milky Way
 2018: Jay Rock – Redemption
 2018: Childish Gambino – "This Is America"
 2018: Cardi B – "She Bad"
 2018: Nipsey Hussle – Victory Lap
 2018: Kendrick Lamar – "Redemption" and "Big Shot"
 2018:	Arin Ray – Platinum Fire
 2017: SZA – Ctrl
 2017: Kendrick Lamar – DAMN.
 2015: Kendrick Lamar – To Pimp a Butterfly
 2012: Kendrick Lamar – good kid, m.A.A.d city
 2012: ScHoolboy Q – Habits & Contradictions
 2012: Ab-Soul – Control System
 2011: ScHoolboy Q – Setbacks
 2011: Ab-Soul  – Longterm Mentality
 2011: Kendrick Lamar – Section.80
 2011: Jay Rock – Follow Me Home
 2010: Kendrick Lamar – Overly Dedicated

Mentors 
Though Ali was introduced to mixing DAWs like Pro Tools by Punch and Dave Free, his most notable professional teacher is Dr. Dre whom he served under as an intern.

References

External links 
  on Discogs
  on AllMusic

1989 births
American audio engineers
Living people
People from Los Angeles
Engineers from California
Grammy Award winners